Where'd You Go, Bernadette is a 2019 American comedy-drama film directed by Richard Linklater from a screenplay by Linklater, Holly Gent, and Vince Palmo, based on the 2012 novel of the same name by Maria Semple. It stars Cate Blanchett, Billy Crudup, Kristen Wiig, Judy Greer, and Laurence Fishburne.

Where'd You Go, Bernadette was released on August 16, 2019, by Annapurna Pictures through their United Artists Releasing joint venture. It received mixed reviews from critics.

Plot
Architect-turned-agoraphobic recluse Bernadette Fox is settled down with her husband Elgie Branch and their 15-year-old daughter Bee in a dilapidated former schoolhouse in Seattle. Bernadette seldom leaves home and cringes at human interaction, including with the other parents at Bee's school, especially their  neighbor, Audrey Griffin. Despite this, she is quite close to Bee.

Bee requests a family trip to Antarctica as reward for good grades, and her parents reluctantly agree. As the trip approaches, Bernadette’s behavior becomes increasingly odd, and she considers use of various prescription drugs to control her worsening anxiety and insomnia. Bernadette’s tension with Audrey also escalates after the latter accuses Bernadette of driving over her foot and the hillside above Audrey's, recently cleared of blackberries by Bernadette, slides into Audrey's garden and house during a rainstorm. Bernadette insists that she was only complying with Audrey's request to remove the invasive plants, but Elgie accuses her of knowing that the hill would collapse without the blackberries to hold it in place.

One day, Bernadette returns home to find Elgie, his assistant, Dr. Kurtz, and FBI Agent Strang at her home for an intervention. They reveal that Manjula, the “personal assistant” in India that Bernadette uses and has given all of her personal and financial information and passwords, is actually a front for a Russian criminal organization that the FBI has been watching. Dr. Kurtz and Elgie want Bernadette to go to a psychiatric hospital for treatment while he and Bee go to Antarctica. Feeling ambushed and misunderstood, Bernadette sneaks out of the house.

Bernadette hides at Audrey's, and they make amends. Audrey helps Bernadette fly to Antarctica without her family. Elgie and Bee follow in hot pursuit, after Agent Strang tells them that the Russian criminals, who were on their way to Seattle to defraud Bernadette while she and her family were away, have been arrested and are no longer a threat.

In Antarctica, Bernadette befriends Becky, a researcher, who tells her the research station at the South Pole has to be completely rebuilt and needs an architect. Bernadette sneaks off her cruise ship and into Palmer Station, and convinces the team leader to give her a spot on the next convoy to the South Pole.

Meanwhile, Elgie realizes he has failed his wife by not being more supportive of her creativity. He and Bee catch up with Bernadette at Palmer Station, and, realizing her passion has been reignited, give their blessing to spend five weeks at the Pole.

Cast

Production
In January 2013, Annapurna Pictures and Color Force acquired the rights to the film adaptation of the novel and set Scott Neustadter and Michael H. Weber to write the screenplay. Semple, Bryan Unkeless, and Ted Schipper executive produced. In February 2015, Richard Linklater was announced as director of the film, and Cate Blanchett was cast as Bernadette in November. In April 2016, it was announced that Holly Gent Palmo and Vince Palmo had taken over writing duties on the film, with Linklater also receiving credit.

In March 2017, Kristen Wiig joined the cast, and Billy Crudup was added in May, marking his second collaboration with Blanchett, after appearing with her in Charlotte Gray (2001). In June, Judy Greer, James Urbaniak, and Laurence Fishburne joined the cast of the film, and Troian Bellisario came on board in July. Emma Nelson's casting was announced in June 2018.

Principal photography began on July 10, 2017. Set in Seattle, filming took place in Pittsburgh and Vancouver. Scenes set in Antarctica were filmed in Greenland.

Graham Reynolds was announced as the film's composer in September 2017.

Release
Originally scheduled for release in the USA on May 11, 2018, the film was later pushed back to October 19. The release date was then pushed to March 22, 2019, and then August 9, before finally settling on August 16, 2019.

The film was significantly delayed for release in the UK for two years due to the film’s huge under-performance, before eventually appearing on Amazon Prime Video and other streaming services on 15 March 2021.

Reception

Box office
In the United States and Canada, Where'd You Go, Bernadette was released alongside Blinded by the Light, 47 Meters Down: Uncaged, and Good Boys, and was projected to gross around $5 million from 2,404 theaters in its opening weekend. It ended up making $1.2 million on its opening day, including $200,000 from Thursday night previews, and $3.5 million for the weekend, finishing 11th at the box office. By the end of its run, the film had grossed $9.2 million domestically and $11 million worldwide on a budget of $18 million.

Critical response
The website's critical consensus reads, "Where'd You Go, Bernadette offers dispiriting proof that a talented director, bestselling source material, and terrific cast can add up to far less than the sum of their parts." On Metacritic, which uses a weighted average, the film has a score of 51 out of 100, based on 39 critics, indicating "mixed or average reviews". Audiences polled by CinemaScore gave the film an average grade of "B" on an A+ to F scale, while those at PostTrak gave it an average of 3.5 out of 5 stars and a 60% "definite recommend".

Richard Roeper of the Chicago Sun-Times gave the film 2 out of 4 stars and wrote: "Filmed in a solid but straightforward style, populated by troubled characters who are aggressively off-putting, frustratingly passive and/or easily lampooned clichés, Where'd You Go, Bernadette is one of the most disappointing movies of 2019." In his 1/4 star review for The Globe and Mail, Barry Hertz said, "There is, buried deep somewhere in Linklater's film or however many edits it may have undergone – the thing reeks of indecision – an insightful, even invigorating story about what happens to a creative genius once they stop creating. But the actual work presents a good argument that, for some artists, it might be best to quit while you're ahead."

Accolades

Architecture 

Two of Bernadette's structures — the fictitious Twenty-Mile House and Beeber Bifocal House — were compared to the first two of 18 visions of Bernadette Soubirous.

Her final conception in the film was based on the Halley Research Station, designed in real life by Hugh Broughton Architects.

References

External links
 

2019 films
2019 comedy-drama films
2010s American films
2010s English-language films
Agoraphobia in fiction
American comedy-drama films
Annapurna Pictures films
Films about architecture
Films about families
Films about missing people
Films based on American novels
Films directed by Richard Linklater
Films set in Antarctica
Films set in Seattle
Films shot in Greenland
Films shot in Pittsburgh
Films shot in Vancouver
Midlife crisis films